Wolf Lake is an unincorporated community in Union County, Illinois, United States. The community is located on Illinois Route 3 between Aldridge to the north and Ware to the south.

Background
On top of part of the bluff that overlooks Wolf Lake is a federally designated wilderness area, Clear Springs Wilderness.

Education
Shawnee High School

References

Unincorporated communities in Union County, Illinois
Unincorporated communities in Illinois